Myelorrhiza is a genus of two Australian species of lichenized fungi in the family Ramalinaceae. It was circumscribed in 1986 by Australian lichenologists Doug Verdon and John A. Elix. Myelorrhiza was originally classified in the family Cladoniaceae until Kistenich and colleagues, using molecular phylogenetic analysis, showed that it is more appropriately placed with the Ramalinaceae.

References

Ramalinaceae
Lichen genera
Lecanorales genera
Taxa described in 1986
Taxa named by John Alan Elix